Christa Stubnick (née Seliger on 12 December 1933 – 13 May 2021) was an East German sprinter who competed for the United Team of Germany in the 1956 Summer Olympics. She won silver medals in the 100 m and 200 m events, splitting the Australians Betty Cuthbert (winner) and Marlene Matthews (third). Her 4×100 m relay team finished sixth.

References

1933 births
2021 deaths
People from Gardelegen
People from the Province of Saxony
German female sprinters
East German female sprinters
German female long jumpers
East German female long jumpers
Sportspeople from Saxony-Anhalt
Olympic athletes of the United Team of Germany
Athletes (track and field) at the 1956 Summer Olympics
Olympic silver medalists for the United Team of Germany
European Athletics Championships medalists
Medalists at the 1956 Summer Olympics
Olympic silver medalists in athletics (track and field)